Myrciaria plinioides, commonly known as , , or , is a species of plant in the family Myrtaceae. It is a shrub that is endemic to Rio Grande do Sul in the south of Brazil.

References

Endemic flora of Brazil
pliniodes
Vulnerable plants
Taxonomy articles created by Polbot
Crops originating from the Americas
Tropical fruit
Flora of South America
Fruits originating in South America
Cauliflory
Fruit trees
Berries